Pardis Mottahed Qazvin Club was an Iranian multisport club based in Qazvin, Iran. They competed in the Iranian Basketball Super League and the Iranian Volleyball Super League.

Basketball
Pardis competed in 2007–08 season and finished 10th.

Notable players
 Jabari Smith

Volleyball
Pardis competed in 2008–09 season and finished 4th.

Notable players
 Peyman Akbari

External links
page on Asia-Basket

Basketball teams in Iran
Iranian volleyball clubs
Qazvin Province